Saṃpūrṇa (संपूर्ण) is a Sanskrit word which means complete, entire, or whole (see sempurna).

Person 
 Sampurna Lahiri, Bengali film and television actress
 Dedi Indra Sampurna, Indonesian footballer

Others 
 Sampurna Nagar, a town in Kheri district, Uttar Pradesh, India
 Sampurna raga, a raga in Indian classical music that has all seven swaras in their scale
 Sampurna Vikas Dal, a political party in the Indian state of Bihar

See also 
Sampoerna, an Indonesian tobacco company
Sampoorna, a school management system project in the Indian state of Kerala